Brightwoods School is a private school in Angeles City. It offers courses from PreSchool to Senior High School. 

It is located at Don Angel Street, Angeles Citicenter, Phase 1, Pandan, Angeles City.

Founded as a pre-elementary program in 1993, it took its current name when it began offering Grade 1 in 1995.

References
Brightwoods School Student Policies and Guidelines Handbook

Educational institutions established in 1993
Schools in Angeles City
1993 establishments in the Philippines